The Lone Star Le Mans (previously known as 6 Hours of the Circuit of the Americas) is an endurance race for Le Mans Prototypes and grand tourer-style cars held at the Circuit of the Americas in Austin, Texas. Its first running was on 22 September 2013 as the fifth round of the 2013 FIA World Endurance Championship season.

On 2 December 2019, the Austin round was revived for 2020, as a result of a conflict between the promoters at the Autodromo Jose Carlos Pace and the WEC, where the Austin round replaced the 6 Hours of São Paulo.

Results

FIA WEC races

Other races

6 Hours of the Americas
The 6 Hours of the Americas was an event organised by the Stéphane Ratel Organisation (SRO) and would have been part of the inaugural season of the Intercontinental GT Challenge on March 6, 2016. On January 29 it was announced that the race would be cancelled with the official reason stated as a lack of entrants.

References

 
2013 establishments in Texas
Recurring sporting events established in 2013